Quintin Young (born 19 September 1947) is a Scottish former footballer. He is best known for his time with Rangers.

Career
Young started his career at local side Ayr United in 1969 before moving to English team Coventry City two years later. After two season in England he moved to Ibrox. He spent three seasons at Rangers and played both legs of the first ever European Super Cup against Ajax Amsterdam. He scored for Rangers in the second leg in Amsterdam, although Rangers still lost the match 3-2 and the tie 6-3 on aggregate.

Young left Rangers acrimoniously after a fall out with then manager Jock Wallace. After requesting a meeting with Wallace because he was unhappy about not being in the first team, an argument ensued and Young was given a free transfer. He subsequently joined East Fife in 1976.

References

External links
Details of Rangers career

1947 births
Living people
Ayr United F.C. players
Coventry City F.C. players
Rangers F.C. players
East Fife F.C. players
Scottish Football League players
English Football League players
Scottish footballers
Association football wingers
Scotland under-23 international footballers
Footballers from Irvine, North Ayrshire